Petersville is an unincorporated community in Eliza Township, Mercer County, Illinois, United States. The Mayor of Petersville is Michael Frazier.

References

Unincorporated communities in Mercer County, Illinois
Unincorporated communities in Illinois